Josiane Kartheiser (born November 28, 1950) is a Luxembourger journalist, novelist, and writer. She writes mainly in German but also in Luxembourgish.

Biography
Born in Differdange, Kartheiser matriculated from the Lycée des jeunes filles in Luxembourg City. From 1971 to 1974, she studied English and American literature at the University of Kent in Canterbury. After working as a free-lance journalist, she taught Luxembourgish both at Sheffield University and at Luxembourg's Centre de langues until she retired in 2010. She drew on her language knowledge as a contributor to the French-Luxembourgish-English dictionary Parler luxembourgeois – Esou schwätze mir – Living Luxemburgish. She has been a regular contributor to several Luxembourg newspapers including Lëtzebuerger Journal, Tageblatt and Le Jeudi.

Kartheiser's publications since 1978 have extended from short stories and essays to poetry, plays and literary criticism to criminal fiction and children's writing.

Awards
In July 2010, Josiane Kartheiser received the Anne Beffort Prize from the City of Luxembourg for her contribution over 25 years to Luxembourg's literary scene at a time when the sector was dominated by men. The award reflected Kartheiser's concern for supporting the place of women in Luxembourg society.

Works
Books
1978: flirt mit fesseln, essays, poetry
1989: wenn schreie in mir wachsen, essays, poetry
1981: Linda, short stories
1988: D’Lästermailchen, cabaret, songs, stories
1989: Luxembourg City, tourist guide
1993: Wohlstandsgeschichten, essays, short stories
1996: Als Maisie fliegen lernte, short stories
2000: Das Seepferdchen, short stories
2002: Allein oder mit anderen, short stories, travel articles
2004: Cornel Meder. Ein Porträt, biography
2005: De Marc hätt gär Paangecher, short stories, cabaret
2007: Mäi léiwen Alen!, short stories, cabaret
2009: Hutt Dir och en Holiday Consultant?, cabaret, stories, travel
2011: Geld oder Liewen!?, cabaret, memoirs
2013: Entführe nicht deines Nächsten Weib, crime stories
2014: Die Shabby Chic Tote, crime stories
2014: Gees de mat?, short story
2015: Kauf dir doch ein Leben!, satirical and critical texts, short stories

For children
2004: De Maxi an de Geschichtenerzieler
2012: Dem Lou säin abenteuerleche Summer

Plays
1983: De Kontrakt
1985: Härgottskanner

References

Luxembourgian novelists
Luxembourgian educators
Luxembourgian women writers
Women novelists
1950 births
Living people
People from Differdange
Luxembourgian journalists
Luxembourgian women journalists
Luxembourgian children's writers
Luxembourgian women children's writers
Luxembourgian short story writers
Luxembourgian essayists
Luxembourgian literary critics
Women literary critics
20th-century Luxembourgian writers
21st-century Luxembourgian writers
20th-century Luxembourgian women writers
21st-century Luxembourgian women writers